Gdańsk Nowy Port is a former SKM stop in Gdańsk, Poland. It is no longer used since December 15, 2002, after shortening the Gdańsk–Nowy Port line to Brzeźno. Despite plans of re-opening the line it is very unlikely that this stop would be restored, as the access to it has been impossible since November 2005.

The line
The line connecting Gdańsk Główny (Danzig Hbf.) with Gdańsk Nowy Port (Danzig Neufahrwasser) was opened in October 1867. It had been electrified in 1951, and the voltage was changed (from 800 V) into standard 3 kV in 1973. The line served mostly as the transport route for dockers who commuted to the Port of Gdańsk.

Over the years the line was losing its passengers to the tram communication. In the last years of operation the train was going once an hour (compared to a tram once a 10 minutes) and tram stops were placed in more convenient places.  On December 15, 2002, the line was shortened to reach only Gdańsk Brzeźno. On June 25, 2005, the line was definitely closed for passenger service. In the year 2007 a track between Gdańsk Brzeźno and Gdańsk Nowy Port was completely disassembled during street rebuilding works, making it unlikely to be restored anytime in the future.

References 
Gdańsk Nowy Port at Polish Railway Database , URL accessed at April 28, 2007.

Railway stations served by Szybka Kolej Miejska (Tricity)
Nowy Port
Railway stations in Poland opened in 1867